The National University Library (Biblioteca nazionale universitaria in Italian) in Turin, Italy, is one of the country's main libraries.

It was founded in 1720 as the Royal University Library by Victor Amadeus II, who unified collections from the library of the University of Turin and from the library of the Dukes of Savoy. It was renamed as the National Library in 1872, after Italian unification.

In 1904 a fire destroyed thousands of books and manuscripts from the library. Expertise gained from recovering from the fire was used to train restorers like Erminia Cuadana.

The library was also bombed in December 1942.

At present time it owns over 763,833 books, 1,095 periodicals and 1,600 incunabula.

References

Further reading 
 G. Ratti, Dal libro alla biblioteca. Le biblioteche pubbliche, Alessandria, Dell'Orso, 1993.

Academic libraries in Italy
Libraries in Turin
Education in Turin
National libraries in Italy
Libraries established in 1720
1720 establishments in Italy